The Road to Damascus (French: Le chemin de Damas) is a 1952 French historical drama film directed by Max Glass and starring Michel Simon, Antoine Balpêtré and Jean-Marc Tennberg. It was shot at the Joinville Studios in Paris. The film's sets were designed by the art director Guy de Gastyne.

Cast
 Michel Simon as 	Caïphe
 Antoine Balpêtré as 	Gamaliel
 Jean-Marc Tennberg as 	Saül de Tarse
 Jacques Dufilho	as Pierre
 Christiane Lénier as Déborah 
 Line Noro as 	La mère d'Etienne 
 François Chaumette as Barnabé
 Nathalie Nerval as 	Magdala
 Maurice Teynac as Le Christ
 Claude Laydu as 	Etienne
 Georges Vitray as 	Le chef de la police 
 Roger Hanin as 	Un disciple
 Charles Vissières as 	Le vieux 
 Pierre Palau		
 Paul Demange 		
 Françoise Goléa
 Guy Mairesse		
 Rivers Cadet		
 Pierre Moncorbier
 Alexandre Mihalesco

References

Bibliography
 Hayward, Susan. French Costume Drama of the 1950s: Fashioning Politics in Film. Intellect Books, 2010.
 Magerstädt, Sylvie. Philosophy, Myth and Epic Cinema: Beyond Mere Illusions. Rowman & Littlefield,  2014.

External links 
 

1952 films
1950s French-language films
1952 drama films
French drama films
Films directed by Max Glass
Films shot at Joinville Studios
1950s French films